Jennifer Anne Mary Alleyne Lash Fiennes (27 February 1938 – 28 December 1993), also known as Jini Fiennes, was an English novelist and painter.

In 1961, she published The Burial, her first novel, at the age of 23. Lash was regarded as one of the most promising young people among England's artists at the time. Upon meeting Lash in Suffolk, Dodie Smith, who wrote The Hundred and One Dalmatians, remarked that Lash was "almost too interesting to be true".

Life and career
Lash was born at Chichester, Sussex on 27 February 1938, the daughter of Joan Mary (née Moore) and Brigadier Henry Alleyne Lash. Lash lived in India, where her father was stationed, until the age of 6. Her uncle Bill Lash was the Bishop of Bombay from 1947 to 1961. When her family returned to England, they settled in Surrey. Raised a Roman Catholic, Lash attended boarding school at the Convent of the Sacred Heart in Tunbridge Wells, Kent, and continued on to Farnham Art School. When she was 16 years old, her studies were cut short by family problems. She discontinued her education and moved to London where she supported herself with odd jobs to support her artistic pursuits.

In the mid-1950s, she met the lyric poet and gallery owner Iris Birtwistle in Churt, Surrey, where they were both living. Shortly afterwards, when Birtwistle moved to Walberswick, Suffolk, Lash went with her and, encouraged by Birtwistle, began work on her first novel, The Burial. Birtwistle renamed Lash "Jini" and introduced her to her future husband Mark Fiennes,
 whom she married in 1962, the year in which her second book The Climate of Belief was published. There were seven children of the marriage: actors Ralph Fiennes and Joseph Fiennes, film makers Martha Fiennes and Sophie Fiennes, composer Magnus Fiennes, Jacob Fiennes, a conservation manager, and foster son Michael Emery, an archaeologist. The family frequently relocated and lived in Suffolk, Wiltshire, Ireland and London. Lash wrote four more novels over the next 20 years: The Prism (1963), Get Down There and Die (1977), The Dust Collector (1979) and From May to October (1980).

Lash's paintings were featured in several exhibitions in The Penwith Galleries in St Ives, The Halesworth Gallery and Westleton Chapel Gallery in Suffolk.

In the late 1980s, Lash was diagnosed with breast cancer. While in remission from the disease, she traveled to Lourdes and Saintes Maries de la Mer in France and to Spain's sacred Santiago de Compostella. During this time, she wrote On Pilgrimage, her only non-fiction book. Lash died on 28 December 1993 at Odstock, Wiltshire, aged 55. Her final novel, Blood Ties, was published posthumously in 1997.

References

External links
The Works Of Jennifer Lash
Collected Jennifer Lash Articles
Jennifer Lash Links Page
For The Love Of Jini by Mick Brown
Obituary For Jini Fiennes

1938 births
1993 deaths
20th-century English painters
English people of Irish descent
Jennifer
Deaths from breast cancer
People from Chichester
People from Walberswick
Deaths from cancer in England
English Roman Catholics
People educated at Beechwood Sacred Heart School
20th-century English women writers
English women novelists
20th-century English novelists